1580 Betulia, provisional designation , is an eccentric, carbonaceous asteroid, classified as near-Earth object of the Amor group, approximately 4.2 kilometers in diameter. It was discovered on 22 May 1950, by South African astronomer Ernest Johnson at the Union Observatory in Johannesburg. The asteroid was named for Betulia Toro, wife of astronomer Samuel Herrick.

Orbit and classification 

Betulia orbits the Sun at a distance of 1.1–3.3 AU once every 3 years and 3 months (1,190 days). Its orbit has an eccentricity of 0.49 and an inclination of 52° with respect to the ecliptic. The body's observation arc begins with its official discovery observation at Johannesburg in 1950.

Close approaches 

As an Amor asteroid, and contrary to the Apollo and Aten asteroids, it approaches Earth's orbit from beyond but does not cross it. Betulia is also a Mars-crosser due to its eccentric orbit.

Physical characteristics 

In the Tholen classification, Betulia is an unusual C-type asteroid, as near-Earth objects are typically of stony rather than carbonaceous composition. Based on images taken by the Sloan Digital Sky Survey, the asteroid has also been characterized as a carbonaceous but "brighter" B-type asteroid.

Rotation period 

Several rotational lightcurves of Betulia were obtained from photometric observations since the 1970s. Analysis of the best-rated lightcurve gave a rotation period of 6.1324 hours with a brightness variation of 0.70 magnitude, indicating that the body has a non-spheroidal shape. Other observations gave a period between 6.130 and 6.48 hours.

Poles 

Photometric and radiometric observations of Betulia were also used to model the asteroid's lightcurve. It gave a concurring period of 6.13836 hours as well as a spin axis of (133.0°, 22.0°) and (136.0°, 22.0°) in ecliptic coordinates (λ, β), respectively. The results supersede previously determined rotational poles (also see LCDB summary).

Diameter and albedo 

According to the survey carried out by the NEOWISE mission of NASA's Wide-field Infrared Survey Explorer, Radar observations at the Arecibo Observatory in Puerto Rico, Tom Gehrels estimate from the Hazards due to Comets and Asteroids, and observations by Alan W. Harris using the NASA Infrared Telescope Facility on Mauna Kea, Hawaii, Betulia measures between 3.82 and 8.55 kilometers in diameter and its surface has an albedo between 0.04 and 0.17.

The Collaborative Asteroid Lightcurve Link takes an albedo of 0.09 and a diameter of 4.2 kilometers as best estimates and adopts an absolute magnitude of 15.1.

Naming 

This minor planet was named after Betulia Toro Herrick, wife of Samuel Herrick (1911–1974), an American astronomer who specialized in celestial mechanics. Herrick had studied the asteroid's orbit, and requested the name, along with that of 1685 Toro. The official  was published by the Minor Planet Center in May 1952.

Further reading

References

External links
 IAUC 1268 - Initial discovery
 Asteroid Lightcurve Database (LCDB), query form (info )
 Dictionary of Minor Planet Names, Google books
 Asteroids and comets rotation curves, CdR – Observatoire de Genève, Raoul Behrend
 
 
 

001580
Discoveries by Ernest Leonard Johnson
Named minor planets
001580
19500522